Aysu is a rare feminine Turkish given name. The name is produced by using two Turkish words: Ay and Su. In Turkish, "Ay" means "Moon" and "Su" means "Water". Therefore, it means "clear/lucid as moon and water".

People

 Aysu Keskin, female basketball player at Fenerbahçe Women's Basketball.
 Aysu Baceoğlu, pop singer and former model.
 Aysu İnsel, professor of economics at Marmara University Faculty of Economics and Administrative Sciences.
 Aysu Ata, professor of Turkology at Ankara University.
 Aysu Erden, literary critic.
 Aysu Koçak, painter.

Turkish feminine given names